The Ray E. Tenhoff Award recognizes the most outstanding technical paper presented at the annual Society of Experimental Test Pilots (SETP) Symposium in Los Angeles, California. The award was established in 1962 and is given in memory of Convair test pilot, Ray E. Tenhoff, founder and first president of SETP. Tenhoff was killed in B-58 Hustler accident on April 22, 1960.

Criteria 
The award is determined by a panel of judges at the completion of the annual SETP Symposium in Los Angeles, California. The award, consisting of a plaque and cash honorarium, is presented at the annual Awards Banquet.

Recipients 
Recipients of this award, from 1962 to present, include:

1962—Thomas P. Frost
1963—Donald R. Segner
1964—Glenn M. Gray
1965—Drury W. Wood, Jr.
1966—Fred W. Haise, Jr.
1967—Drury W. Wood, Jr.
1968—Olle Klinker and Erik Dahlstrom
1969—Larry G. Van Pelt
1970—James Pollitt
1971—Norm Driscoll
1972—Paul S. Norton
1973—Flt Lt John Potter, RAF
1974—Karl-Eric Henriksson
1975—Charles C. Bock, Jr.
1976—Lt Col John H. Taylor, USAF
1977—Raymond L. McPherson
1978—A. Scott Crossfield
1979—John E. Krings
1980—LCDR Richard N. Richards, USN and Carroll D. Pilcher
1981—Maj Ivan M. Behel, USMC and William B. McNamera
1982—G. Warren Hall and LTC Robert K. Merrill, USA
1983—Charles A. Sewell
1984—G. Warren Hall and LTC Patrick M. Morris, USA
1985—Stephen Ishmael and Lt Col Ted Wierzbanowski, USAF
1986—Lt Col Frank T. Birk
1987—William H. Dana and Nicholas D. Lappos
1988—Laurence A. Walker and Lt Col William R. Neely, Jr., USAF
1989—LCDR Mike Carriker, USN and SqnLdr David Southwood, RAF
1990—LCDR Kent Rominger, USN and Jennings Bryant, NATC
1991—Capt Chris A. Hadfield, RCAF and Sharon W. Houck
1992—C. Gordon Fullerton and Maj Regis Hancock, USAF
1993—C. Gordon Fullerton
1994—Maj William J. Norton, USAF and Maj Pamela A. Melroy, USAF
1995—Capt Ricardo Traven, CAF, Susan E. Whitley and F. Alan Frazier
1996—Capt Maurice Girard, CAF and Capt Stuart McIntosh, CAF
1997—Capt Greg Weber, USAF and Maj Kevin Christensen, USAF
1998—Ricardo Traven, John Hagan
1999—Ralph Johnston and Robert Ryan
2000—Horst Philipp
2001—Maj Tim McDonald, USAF and Steve Barter
2002—Ricardo Traven, The Boeing Company
2003—Burt Rutan, Doug Shane
2004—Bill Gray
2005—Norman Howell
2006—Maj Douglas Wickert, USAF
2007—Justin Paines, QinetiQ; Buddy Denham, Naval Air Systems Command
2008—Lt Col Daniel D. Daetz, USAF; Maj Jack D. Fischer, USAF; Brian Knaup, Dept. of the USAF
2009—Robert A. Rivers, NASA
2010—Flt Lt Dane Petersen, RAAF and Sqn Ldr Darren Hughes, RAAF
2011—Sqn Ldr Simon Seymour-Dale, RAF
2012—Aaron Tobias, Cessna and Maurice Girard, Cessna
2013—Mark Stucky, Clint Nichols, Mike Alsbury, Scaled Composites
2014—Maj Casey Richardson, USAF, Capt Michael Pacini, USAF, P. Travis Millet, Dept. of the Air Force
2015—Lt Brent Robinson, USN, James Denham, Dept. of the Navy
2016—Maurice Girard and Richard Ling, Bombardier Aerospace
2017—Lt Col Matt Russell, USAF
2018—Col Douglas Wickert, USAF
2019 - Evan Thomas, Scaled Composites; Christopher Guarante, Boom Technology; Jake Riley, Scaled Composites 
2020 - Lt Col Justin Elliott, USAF; Lt Col David Schmitt, USAF
2021 - Kelly Latimer, Virgin Galactic, Todd Ericson, Virgin Orbit, Zack Rubin, Virgin Orbit, Bryce Schaefer, Virgin Orbit
2022 - Maj Aaron E Okun  and Robert Vitagliano

See also

 List of aviation awards

References

Aviation awards